Walker M. Curtiss (November 1, 1852 – January 18, 1917) was an American farmer and politician.

Born in the town of Salem, Kenosha County, Wisconsin, Curtiss lived in the community of Trevor, Wisconsin, graduated from Beloit College, and was a farmer. He served in several public offices. Curtiss was a member of the Wisconsin State Assembly from 1905 to 1911 and was a Republican. Curtiss died at his home in Trevor, Wisconsin.

References

1852 births
1917 deaths
People from Salem Lakes, Wisconsin
Beloit College alumni
Farmers from Wisconsin
Republican Party members of the Wisconsin State Assembly
19th-century American politicians